The People's Republic of China competed at the 2020 Summer Olympics in Tokyo, Japan. Originally scheduled to take place from 24 July to 9 August 2020, the Games were postponed to 23 July to 8 August 2021 because of the COVID-19 pandemic. It was the nation's eleventh appearance at the Summer Olympics since its debut in 1952. The opening ceremony flag-bearers for China are volleyball player Zhu Ting and taekwondoin Zhao Shuai. Sprinter Su Bingtian, who broke the Asian record of 100m during the Games, is the flag-bearer for the closing ceremony. The delegation competed in all sports except baseball (softball), handball, and surfing.

China finished the Game with 89 medals, 38 of them gold, an improvement of their previous performance at the last Olympics of 70 medals and 26 gold, which moved it up to the second place in overall medal standing from the third place it occupied at the Rio Games. China state media subsequently included the medals won by Hong Kong and Taiwan, even though both of them have their own separate NOCs.

Medalists 

| width="78%" align="left" valign="top" |

| width="22%" align="left" valign="top" |

| width="22%" align="left" valign="top" |

Competitors 
The following is the list of number of competitors in the Games. Note that reserves in field hockey, association football, and water polo are not counted. Chinese state media reported that China sent 431 athletes including reserves, while the IOC website listed 421 athletes from China.

Archery

Chinese archers qualified each for the men's and women's events by reaching the quarterfinal stage of their respective team recurves at the 2019 World Archery Championships in 's-Hertogenbosch, Netherlands. The Chinese archery team, led by Rio 2016 Olympians Wang Dapeng and Wu Jiaxin, was named to the Tokyo 2020 roster on 27 April 2021.

Men

Women

Mixed

Artistic swimming

China fielded a squad of eight artistic swimmers to compete in the women's duet and team routine by obtaining one of two highest-ranked spots, not yet qualified, in the team free routine at the 2019 FINA World Championships in Gwangju, South Korea.

Athletics

Chinese athletes further achieved the entry standards, either by qualifying time or by world ranking, in the following track and field events (up to a maximum of 3 athletes in each event):

Track & road events
Men

 On 18 February 2022, Great Britain was disqualified from the men's 4 × 100 m relay because of a doping violation, thereby officially stripping them of the silver medal. In this case, Canada will be upgraded to silver, with China receiving the bronze. Medals have not yet been reallocated.

Women

Field events
Men

Women

Combined events – Women's heptathlon

Badminton

China entered fourteen badminton players (five men and nine women) for the following events based on the BWF Race to Tokyo Rankings; two entries each in the men's and women's singles, two pairs each in the  women's and mixed doubles, and one entry in the men's doubles.

Men

Women

Mixed

Basketball

Indoor
Summary

Women's tournament

China women's basketball team qualified for the Olympics as one of two highest-ranked eligible squads from group B at the Belgrade meet of the 2020 FIBA Women's Olympic Qualifying Tournament.

Team roster

Group play

Quarterfinal

3×3

Summary

Men's tournament

China men's national 3x3 team qualified directly for the Olympics by securing an outright berth, as one of the three highest-ranked squads, in the men's category of the FIBA rankings.

Team roster
The players were named on 2 July 2021.

Hu Jinqiu
Gao Shiyan
Li Haonan
Yan Peng

Group play

Women's tournament

China women's national 3x3 team qualified directly for the Olympics by securing an outright berth, as one of the four highest-ranked squads, in the women's category of the FIBA rankings.

Team roster
The players were named on 2 July 2021.

Wan Jiyuan
Wang Lili
Yang Shuyu
Zhang Zhiting

Group play

Quarter-final

Semi-final

Bronze medal match

Boxing 

China entered six boxers (three per gender) into the Olympic tournament. Rio 2016 bronze medalists Hu Jianguan (men's flyweight) and Li Qian (women's middleweight), along with rookies Tuohetaerbieke Tanglatihan (men's middleweight), Chen Daxiang (men's light heavyweight), Chang Yuan (women's flyweight), and Gu Hong (women's welterweight), secured the spots on the Chinese squad by advancing to the semifinal match of their respective weight divisions at the 2020 Asia & Oceania Qualification Tournament in Amman, Jordan.

Canoeing

Slalom
Chinese canoeists have qualified a maximum of one boat in each of the following classes through the 2019 ICF Canoe Slalom World Championships in La Seu d'Urgell, Spain and the 2021 Asian Canoe Slalom Championships in Pattaya, Thailand.

Sprint
Chinese canoeists qualified six boats in each of the following distances for the Games through the 2019 ICF Canoe Sprint World Championships in Szeged, Hungary and the 2021 Asian Championships in Pattaya, Thailand.

Men

Women

Qualification Legend: FA = Qualify to final (medal); FB = Qualify to final B (non-medal); SF = Qualify to semifinal round; QF = Qualify to quarterfinal round

Cycling

Road
China entered one rider each to compete in the men's and women's Olympic road races, by virtue of his top 50 national finish (for men) and her top 100 individual finish (for women) in the UCI World Ranking.

Track
Following the completion of the 2020 UCI Track Cycling World Championships, Chinese riders accumulated spots in the women's team sprint, as well as the women's sprint, keirin, and omnium, based on their country's results in the final UCI Olympic rankings.

Unable to earn a spot in the men's team sprint, China won a single quota place in the men's individual sprint through the UCI Olympic rankings. Qualification for the individual sprint thereby implies a quota place being added to the men's keirin.

Sprint

Team sprint

Qualification legend: FA=Gold medal final; FB=Bronze medal final

Keirin

Qualification legend: FA=Medal final; FB=7–12 placement final

Omnium

Mountain biking
Chinese mountain bikers qualified for one men's and one women's quota place into the Olympic cross-country race, by virtue of a top two national finish, respectively, at the 2019 Asian Championships.

Diving

Chinese divers qualified for the following individual spots and synchronized teams at the Olympics through the 2019 FINA World Championships.

Men

Women

Equestrian

China fielded a squad of three equestrian riders for the first time into the team competitions by securing an outright berth each, as one of two top-ranked nations, qualified at the International Equestrian Federation (FEI)-designated Olympic eventing qualifier for Group F and G (Africa, Middle East, Asia and Oceania) in Saumur, France and at the Olympic jumping qualifier for Group G in Valkenswaard, Netherlands, respectively.

Eventing
Liang Ruiji and Agore de Bordenave have been named the traveling alternates.

Jumping

Fencing

Chinese fencers qualified a full squad each in the women's team épée at the Games by finishing among the top four nations in the FIE Olympic Team Rankings, while the women's sabre team claimed the continental spot as the highest-ranked team from Asia and Oceania. Vying for qualification as the next highest-ranked country across all regions, the men's épée team accepted a spare berth freed up by Africa to complete the route in the rankings. Xu Yingming (men's sabre) and Chen Qingyuan (women's foil) secured additional places on the Chinese team as one of the two highest-ranked fencers vying for individual qualification from Asia and Oceania in the FIE Adjusted Official Rankings, while the reigning Asian Games gold medalist Huang Mengkai rounded out the Chinese roster by winning the final match of the men's foil at the Asia and Oceania Zonal Qualifier in Tashkent, Uzbekistan.

Men

Women

Field hockey

Summary

Women's tournament

China women's national field hockey team qualified for the Olympics by securing one of the seven tickets available and defeating Belgium in a playoff at the Changzhou leg of the 2019 FIH Olympic Qualifiers.

Team roster

Group play

Football

Summary

Women's tournament

China PR qualified for the Games by defeating South Korea in a two-legged playoff of the 2020 AFC Olympic Qualifying Tournament.

Team roster

Group play

Golf

China entered two male and two female golfers into the Olympic tournament.

Gymnastics

Artistic
China fielded a full squad of four gymnasts each in both the men's and women's artistic gymnastics events by virtue of a top three finish in the team all-around at the 2018 World Artistic Gymnastics Championships in Doha, Qatar. Both teams were announced on 3 July 2021.

Men
Team

Individual finals

Women
Team

Individual finals

Rhythmic
China qualified a squad of rhythmic gymnasts for the group all-around by finishing in the top five at the 2019 World Championships in Baku, Azerbaijan.

Trampoline
China qualified one gymnast each for the men's and women's trampoline by finishing in the top eight, respectively, at the 2019 World Championships in Tokyo, Japan. China qualified the second spot in both men's and women's trampoline through the 2019–2020 Trampoline World Cup series. The athletes were announced on 9 June 2021.

Judo

China entered six female judoka into the Olympic tournament based on the International Judo Federation Olympics Individual Ranking.

Karate
 
China entered two karateka into the inaugural Olympic tournament. 2018 Asian Games champion and world silver medalist Yin Xiaoyan (women's 61 kg) and Gong Li (women's +61 kg) qualified directly for their respective kumite categories by finishing among the top four karateka at the end of the combined WKF Olympic Rankings.

Modern pentathlon
 
Chinese athletes qualified for the following spots to compete in modern pentathlon. Asian Games bronze medalist Luo Shuai and champion Zhang Mingyu confirmed places each in the men's and women's event, respectively, with the former finishing second and the latter fourth among those eligible for Olympic qualification at the 2019 Asia & Oceania Championships in Kunming.

Rowing

China qualified eight boats for each of the following rowing classes into the Olympic regatta, with the majority of crews confirming Olympic places for their boats at the 2019 FISA World Championships in Ottensheim, Austria. Meanwhile, two more boats (women's four and women's eight) were awarded to the Chinese roster with a top-two finish at the 2021 FISA Final Qualification Regatta in Lucerne, Switzerland.

Men

Women

Qualification Legend: FA=Final A (medal); FB=Final B (non-medal); FC=Final C (non-medal); FD=Final D (non-medal); FE=Final E (non-medal); FF=Final F (non-medal); SA/B=Semi-finals A/B; SC/D=Semi-finals C/D; SE/F=Semi-finals E/F; QF=Quarter-finals; R=Repechage

Rugby sevens

Summary

Women's tournament

The China women's national rugby sevens team qualified for the Games by winning the silver medal and securing a lone outright berth at the 2019 Asian Olympic Qualifying Tournament in Guangzhou, marking the country's debut in the sport.

Team roster
 Women's team event – 1 team of 12 players

Group play

Quarter-final

Classification

Sailing

Chinese sailors qualified one boat in each of the following classes through the 2018 Sailing World Championships, the class-associated Worlds, the 2018 Asian Games, and the continental regattas.

Men

Women

Mixed

 Legend: M = Medal race; EL = Eliminated – did not advance into the medal race; † – Discarded race not counted in the overall result

Shooting

Chinese shooters achieved quota places for the following events by virtue of their best finishes at the 2018 ISSF World Championships, the 2019 ISSF World Cup series, and Asian Championships, as long as they obtained a minimum qualifying score (MQS) by 5 June 2021. To assure their nomination to the Olympic team, shooters must finish in the top two of each individual event at the Olympic Trials for rifle & pistol (March 16 to 25) in Guangzhou.

The rifle and pistol team was officially announced on March 29, 2021, featuring Beijing 2008 gold medalist Pang Wei (men's 10 m air pistol), Rio 2016 bronze medalist Li Yuehong (men's 25 m rapid fire pistol), and 2014 Youth Olympic men's air rifle champion Yang Haoran.

Men

Women

Mixed

Skateboarding

China entered two skateboarder into the Olympic tournament. Zhang Xin was automatically selected among the top 16 eligible skateboarders in the women's park based on the World Skate Olympic Rankings of June 30, 2021.

Sport climbing

China entered two sport climbers into the Olympic tournament. 2018 Youth Olympic fifth-place finalist Pan Yufei and Song Yiling qualified directly each for the men's and women's combined event, respectively, by finishing in the top six of those eligible for qualification at the IFSC World Olympic Qualifying Event in Toulouse, France.

Swimming

Chinese swimmers further achieved qualifying standards in the following events (up to a maximum of 2 swimmers in each event at the Olympic Qualifying Time (OQT), and potentially 1 at the Olympic Selection Time (OST)): To assure their selection to the Olympic team, swimmers must finish in the top two of each individual pool event under the Olympic qualifying cut at the Chinese National Championships and Olympic Trials (April 30 to May 8, 2021) in Qingdao and at the Final Qualifying Event in Xi'an; or the first-place winners at the 2019 FINA World Championships, if they have reached the qualifying standards but failed to qualify in those domestic qualification events in any means.

Men

Women

Mixed

 Swimmers who participated in the heats only.

Table tennis

China entered six athletes into the table tennis competition at the Games. The men's and women's teams secured their respective Olympic berths by winning the gold medal each at the 2019 ATTU Asian Championships in Jakarta, Indonesia, permitting a maximum of two starters to compete each in the men's and women's singles tournament. Moreover, an additional berth was awarded to the Chinese table tennis players competing in the inaugural mixed doubles by advancing to the semifinal stage of the 2019 ITTF World Tour Grand Finals in Zhengzhou.

Men

Women

* On August 1, Liu Shiwen, originally set to compete in the women's team, was replaced by Wang Manyu after suffering a recurring elbow injury from the mixed doubles.

Mixed

Taekwondo

China entered six athletes into the taekwondo competition at the Games. Rio 2016 flyweight champion Zhao Shuai (men's 68 kg), 2019 world champion Zhang Mengyu (women's 67 kg), and defending Olympic champion Zheng Shuyin (women's +67 kg) qualified directly for their respective weight classes by finishing among the top five taekwondo practitioners at the end of the WT Olympic Rankings.

Zhou Lijun scored a gold-medal victory over Great Britain's two-time defending champion Jade Jones to book an Olympic spot in the women's lightweight final (57 kg) of the 2019 World Grand Slam series. Meanwhile, double Olympic champion Wu Jingyu received a spare berth freed up by the World Grand Slam winner in the women's flyweight category (49 kg), as the next highest-placed taekwondo practitioner, not yet qualified, in the rankings, to round out the Chinese roster for her fourth straight Games.

Sun Hongyi completed the Chinese taekwondo roster by finishing in the top-two final of the men's heavyweight category (+80 kg) at the 2021 Asian Qualification Tournament in Amman, Jordan.

Tennis

China entered five tennis players, all women, into the Olympic tournament. One singles player, Wang Qiang secured the outright berth by winning the women's singles title at the 2018 Asian Games in Jakarta. Besides Wang Qiang, China also entered two pairs of double players, Xu Yifan pairs with Yang Zhaoxuan, while Duan Yingying pairs with Zheng Saisai.

Triathlon
 
China has entered one triathlete to compete at the Games.

Volleyball

Beach

Women's tournament

Chinese women's beach volleyball teams qualified directly for the Olympics after winning the gold medal at the 2018–2020 AVC Beach Volleyball Continental Cup final round in Nakhon Pathom, Thailand.

Indoor
Summary

Women's tournament

China women's volleyball team qualified for the Olympics by securing an outright berth as the highest-ranked nation for pool B at the Intercontinental Olympic Qualification Tournament in Ningbo.

Team roster

Group play

Water polo

Summary

Women's tournament

China women's national water polo team qualified for the Olympics by winning the gold medal and securing an outright berth at the 2018 Asian Games in Jakarta, Indonesia.

Team roster

Group play

Quarterfinal

Classification

Weightlifting

Chinese weightlifters qualified for eight quota places at the games, based on the Tokyo 2020 Rankings Qualification List of 11 June 2021.

Men

Women

Wrestling

China qualified eleven wrestlers for each of the following classes into the Olympic competition. Five of them finished among the top six to book Olympic spots in the men's freestyle 125 kg and women's freestyle (50, 53, 57 and 76 kg) at the 2019 World Championships, while six additional licenses were awarded to the Chinese wrestlers, who progressed to the top two finals of their respective weight categories at the 2021 Asian Qualification Tournament in Almaty, Kazakhstan.

Freestyle

Greco-Roman

Politics
Chinese diplomats engaged in wolf warrior diplomacy during the Olympics with issue being taken with the way Chinese athletes were being depicted by the media and by the Taiwanese team being introduced as "Taiwan" instead of Chinese Taipei. The Chinese consulate in New York City complained that NBC had used an inaccurate map of China in their coverage because it did not include Taiwan and the South China Sea. The consulate said that the map "created a very bad influence and harmed the dignity and emotion of the Chinese people." The consulate took to Twitter writing "Using a wrong map of #China is a real lack of common sense. Politicizing sports and violating the Olympics Charter spirits will only do harm to the #Olympic Games and the relationship between the #Chinese and the #Americans."

Chinese diplomats took issue with CNN's coverage of China's first gold medal when it published a headline saying "Gold for China…and more COVID-19 cases".

A win by Taiwan over China in badminton increased tensions between the two countries. Tensions between China and Taiwan over the Olympics has also resulted in increased calls in Taiwan to rename their Olympic team.

On August 1 the Embassy of China, London criticized the BBC's coverage of the Olympics, particularly its Taiwan-related coverage. The embassy also condemned a News.com.au article cited by the BBC. The statement said that "The reports on the BBC Chinese website and news.com.au about the participation of ‘Chinese Taipei’ in Tokyo Olympics are unprofessional and severely misleading. The Chinese side is gravely concerned and strongly opposes this." On August 4 the embassy again criticized the BBC's coverage of Taiwan's participation in the Olympics saying that a BBC article explaining the history of Taiwan's Olympic moniker "Chinese Taipei" had been "sensationalizing the question of the 'Chinese Taipei' team at the Tokyo Olympics." and went on to state "[China] strongly urges these media to follow international consensus and professional conduct, to stop politicizing sports, and to stop interference with the Tokyo Olympic Games."

See also
China at the 2020 Summer Paralympics

References

Nations at the 2020 Summer Olympics
2020
2021 in Chinese sport